Władysław Albert Anders (11 August 1892 – 12 May 1970) was a general in the Polish Army and later in life a politician and prominent member of the Polish government-in-exile in London.

Biography

Before World War II
Both his parents were of Baltic-German origin and he was baptised as a member of the Protestant Evangelical-Augsburg Church in Poland. He had three brothers – Karol, Tadeusz and Jerzy, all of whom also went on to pursue careers in the military.

Anders attended a technical high school in Warsaw and later studied at Riga Technical University, where he became a member of the Polish student fraternity . After graduation Anders was accepted into the Russian Military School for reserve officers. As a young officer, he served in the 1st Krechowiecki Lancers Regiment of the Imperial Russian Army during World War I.

When Poland regained its independence in November 1918, Anders joined the newly formed Polish Land Forces. During the Polish–Soviet War of 1919–1921 he commanded the 15th Poznań Uhlans Regiment and was awarded the Silver Cross of the Virtuti Militari. After the war Anders continued his military education in France at the École spéciale militaire de Saint-Cyr and upon graduation he returned to Poland, where he served on the general staff of the Polish Army under General Tadeusz Jordan-Rozwadowski (Chief of the General Staff from 1920 to 1921).

Anders opposed Józef Piłsudski's May Coup in Poland in 1926, but unlike Jordan-Rozwadowski, he avoided persecution by the Sanation regime that assumed power after the coup. Piłsudski made him the commander of a cavalry brigade in 1931 and he was promoted to the rank of general three years later.

World War II
Anders commanded the Nowogródzka Cavalry Brigade during the German invasion of Poland in September 1939 and was immediately called into action, taking part in the Battle of Mława. After the collapse of the Polish Northern Front the brigade withdrew towards Warsaw, and also fought heavy battles against the Germans around Mińsk Mazowiecki and in the second phase of the Battle of Tomaszów Lubelski. After learning about the Soviet invasion of Poland, Anders retreated south in the direction of Lwów, hoping to reach the Hungarian or Romanian border, but was intercepted by Soviet forces and captured on 29 September, after being wounded twice.

Anders was initially jailed in Lwów and subsequently transferred to the Lubyanka prison in Moscow on 29 February 1940. During his imprisonment, he was interrogated, tortured and unsuccessfully urged to join the Red Army.

After the launch of Operation Barbarossa and the signing of the Sikorski-Maisky agreement, Anders was released by the Soviets with the aim of forming a Polish Army to fight against the Germans alongside the Red Army. Continued friction with the Soviets over political issues as well as shortages of weapons, food and clothing, led to the eventual evacuation of Anders' men – known as Anders' Army – together with a sizeable contingent of Polish civilians who had been deported to the USSR from Soviet-occupied Poland, via the Persian Corridor into Iran, Iraq, and finally into Mandatory Palestine. The evacuation, which took place in March 1942, was based on the British-Soviet-Polish understanding. The soldiers involved were evacuated from the Soviet Union and made their way through Iran to British-ruled Palestine, where they passed under British command. Here, Anders formed and led the Polish II Corps, while continuing to agitate for the release of Polish nationals still in the Soviet Union.

The Polish II Corps became a major tactical and operational unit of the Polish Armed Forces in the West. Anders commanded the Corps throughout the Italian Campaign, capturing Monte Cassino on 18 May 1944, Ancona on 18 July 1944; afterward his Corps took part in the breaking of the Gothic Line and in the final spring offensive.

The morale of the Polish forces was weakened by the outcome of the Yalta Conference which ended on 11 February, where the British and Americans, without consultation with the Poles, had decided to give a major part of the 1921–1939 Polish territories to the Soviet Union. When Anders asked for his unit to be withdrawn from the front line, Winston Churchill told him "you [the Poles] are no longer needed" but the American and British front line commanders—Generals Richard McCreery, Mark Wayne Clark and Field Marshal Harold Alexander—requested Anders that the Polish units remain in their positions, as they had no troops to replace them. Anders eventually decided to keep the Polish units engaged. So they fought together with the Allies in the Battle of Bologna.

After World War II
After the war, the Soviet-installed communist government of Poland deprived him of Polish citizenship and of his military rank. Anders had, however, always been unwilling to return to a Soviet-dominated Poland where he probably would have been jailed and possibly executed, and remained in Britain. He was prominent in the Polish Government in Exile in London and became General Inspector of the Armed Forces, as well as working on behalf of various charities and welfare organisations. His book about his experiences during the Second World War, An Army in Exile, was first published by MacMillan & Co, London, in 1949.

Anders died in London on 12 May 1970, where his body lay in state at St Andrew Bobola Church, and many of his former soldiers and their families came to pay their last respects. He was buried, in accordance with his wishes, amongst his fallen soldiers from the 2nd Polish Corps at the Polish War Cemetery at Monte Cassino in Italy. After the collapse of communist rule in Poland in 1989, his citizenship and military rank were posthumously reinstated.

Many personal effects which once belonged to Anders are on display in the Polish Institute and Sikorski Museum in London. In June 2021, General Anders's bust designed by Andrzej Pitynski was officially unveiled at London's National Army Museum.

Private life
Anders was married twice. He had two children with his first wife Irena Maria Jordan-Krąkowska (born 1894, died 1981) – a daughter, Anna (born 1919, died 2006) and a son, George (born 1927, died 1983).

In 1948, he married the actress and singer Irena Jarosiewicz, better known under her stage name Renata Bogdańska, with whom he had a daughter, Anna Maria (born in 1950).

Medals

Anders received numerous awards and decorations:

Poland
 Order of the White Eagle (awarded posthumously on 11 November 1995 by Lech Wałęsa)
 Virtuti Militari 
  Commander's Cross (2nd class)
  Knight's Cross (3rd class)
  Golden Cross (4th class) 
  Silver Cross (5th class)
  Order of Polonia Restituta 
  Commander's Cross (3rd class) 
  Officer's Cross (4th class)
  Cross of Independence
  Cross of Valour (four times: Polish–Soviet War (3) & Invasion of Poland)
  Gold Cross of Merit with Swords (four times)
  Army Medal (four times)
  Commemorative Medal for War 1918–1921
  Medal of the 10th Anniversary of Independence
 Medal of 3rd May
 Medal for Long Service
  Silver (20 years)
  Bronze (10 years) 
  Home Army Cross
  Monte Cassino Commemorative Cross
 Wound Decoration, (eight times)

Foreign
Czechoslovakia
  Order of the White Lion

France
  Commander of the Légion d'honneur
  Croix de Guerre avec Palme
  Médaille Interalliée de la Victoire 1914–1918

Italy
  Order of Saints Maurice and Lazarus (1st class)
  War Cross for Military Valor

The Sovereign Military Order of Malta
 Grand Cross of Merit

Persia
  Order of Homayoun (1st class)

Imperial Russia
  Order of St. George (4th class, 1915)
  Order of St. Vladimir with Swords (4th class, 1915)
  Order of St. Anna with Swords (2nd, 3rd (1918) and 4th class)
  Order of Saint Stanislas with Swords (2nd and 3rd classes, 1918)

United Kingdom
  Honorary Companion of the Order of the Bath
  1939–1945 Star
  Italy Star
  Defence Medal
  War Medal

United States of America
  Commander of the Legion of Merit
 Order of Lafayette

Kingdom of Yugoslavia
  Commander of the Order of St. Sava

See also
 List of Poles
 Anders' Army
 Anders (tank)
 History of Poland (1939–45)
 Polish Armed Forces in the East
 Polish Armed Forces in the West
 Polish contribution to World War II
 Polish government-in-exile
 Western betrayal

Notes

External links
 
 Władysław Anders Collection at the Hoover Institution Archives
 
 Professor Norman Davies on his forthcoming book Trail of Hope and Anders' exodus from the USSR

1892 births
1970 deaths
People from Krośniewice
People from Warsaw Governorate
Military personnel from Warsaw
Baltic-German people
Polish Roman Catholics
Converts to Roman Catholicism from Lutheranism
Polish generals
Rada Trzech
Riga Technical University alumni
Military personnel of the Russian Empire
Russian military personnel of World War I
Polish I Corps in Russia personnel
Polish people of the Polish–Soviet War
People of the Polish May Coup (pro-government side)
Polish military personnel of World War II
Polish deportees to Soviet Union
Polish anti-communists
Polish exiles
Commanders of the Virtuti Militari
Commanders of the Order of Polonia Restituta
Recipients of the Order of Saint Stanislaus (Russian)
Recipients of the Croix de Guerre (France)
Recipients of the Order of St. Anna, 2nd class
Commandeurs of the Légion d'honneur
Recipients of the Cross of Independence
Recipients of the Cross of Merit with Swords (Poland)
Commanders of the Legion of Merit
Recipients of the Order of the White Lion
Knights Grand Cross of the Order of Saints Maurice and Lazarus
Recipients of the War Cross for Military Valor
Commanders of the Order of St. Sava
Recipients of the Order of St. Vladimir, 4th class
Recipients of the Cross of Valour (Poland)
Honorary Companions of the Order of the Bath
Recipients of the Order of the White Eagle (Poland)